Plinacro is a natural gas transmission system operator in Croatia.

History
Plinacro was founded on 1 February 2001 as a subsidiary of INA. Since March 2002, Plinacro is a fully state-owned company.

Operations
Plinacro operates  of high pressure gas pipelines. On 3 March 2009, Plinacro signed an agreement with FGSZ Zrt, a subsidiary of MOL Group, to build a   natural gas interconnector between Croatia and Hungary, which would allow two-way shipments after the Adria LNG terminal is built on the island of Krk. Plinacro was also invited to the consortium building Adria LNG terminal. After failure of Adria LNG terminal, Plinacro participated in LNG Hrvatska project where they own 16% of stocks.

Plinacro is participating in the work of creation of the New European Transmission System, a project to unite Central and South Eastern Europe's natural gas transmission networks.

In January 2009, it was decided that Plinacro will buy the Okoli gas storage facility from INA as a result of the INA's takeover by MOL.

References

External links

 

Oil and gas companies of Croatia
Natural gas pipeline companies
2001 establishments in Croatia
Companies based in Zagreb
Government-owned companies of Croatia